Herman Theodore Lange (April 9, 1858 – June 3, 1938) was a member of the Wisconsin State Senate.

Biography
Lange was born on April 9, 1858 in Portage, Wisconsin. He was active in the grocery and canning businesses. He died of a heart attack on June 3, 1938.

Political career
Lange represented the 28th district of the Senate from 1921 to 1928. In addition, Lange was an Eau Claire, Wisconsin alderman. He was a Republican.

References

External links

People from Portage, Wisconsin
Politicians from Eau Claire, Wisconsin
Republican Party Wisconsin state senators
Wisconsin city council members
1858 births
1938 deaths